Pistone Vunyoli Mutamba (born 12 November 1997) is a Kenyan footballer who plays as a forward for Nepalese Club Himalayan Sherpa Club and the Kenya national team.

International career
Mutamba made his debut for Kenya on 25 May 2018 against Eswatini.

Career statistics

International
Statistics accurate as of match played 11 September 2018

International goals
Scores and results list Kenya's goal tally first.

References

External links
 
 

1997 births
Living people
Kenyan footballers
Kenya international footballers
Association football forwards
Sofapaka F.C. players
Kenyan Premier League players